Oktay Yıldırım (born 28 September 1971) is a former member of Turkey's Special Warfare Department, and was a defendant in the Ergenekon trials as well as the Turkish Council of State shooting. On 5 August 2013 Yıldırım was sentenced to 33 years and 10 months. Yıldırım was a founder in 2005 of the Kuvayı Milliye Derneği, and was head of its Istanbul branch.

Yıldırım was stationed in the Hasdal barracks; he was in the 6th Infantry Brigade from August 1999 to April 2005. He retired in 2005 due to disability.

Books
 Ergenekon bombalarının sırrı, Istanbul: Kaynak Yayınları, 2010.  	
 Savaşmadan Kaybetmek: "Türkiye'nin Silahsız İşgali", Kaynak Yayınları, 2010. 
 Mehmetçik: Tarihsel ve İdeolojik Kökeni, Kaynak Yayınları, 2011.

See also
 :tr:Osman Yıldırım

References 

1971 births
Living people
People from Erzurum
Special Warfare Department personnel
Prisoners and detainees of Turkey
People convicted in the Ergenekon trials
Turkish non-commissioned personnel